This list of electoral wards in Rhondda Cynon Taf includes council wards, which elect councillors to Rhondda Cynon Taf County Borough Council and community wards, which elect councillors to community councils.

Current wards

County borough wards
Since the 2022 local elections the county borough has been divided into 46 electoral divisions, electing 75 councillors. A small number of communities elect community (or town) councils (indicated below with a *). The following table lists council divisions, communities, and associated geographical areas:

Community wards

2022 county borough ward changes
A review of electoral arrangements by the Local Democracy and Boundary Commission for Wales resulted in a reduction in the number of county borough wards from 52 to 46, though retaining the same number of councillors. Twenty wards remained the same: Abercynon, Aberdare East, Aberdare West/Llwydcoed, Cilfynydd, Cwm Clydach, Gilfach Goch, Glyncoch, Llantwit Fardre, Penrhiwceiber, Pentre, Pen-y-Graig, Pen-y-Waun, Pontypridd Town, Porth, Taffs Well, Treforest, Tonypandy, Tonyrefail East, Trallwng, Treherbert. The proposals would take effect from the 2022 council elections.

Pre-2022 county borough wards

Until May 2022 the Rhondda Cynon Taf county borough was divided into 52 electoral wards returning 75 councillors. Some of these electoral wards were coterminous with communities (parishes) of the same name. The following table lists council electoral wards, communities and associated geographical areas:

* = Communities which elect a community council
c = Ward coterminous with community of the same name

See also
 List of places in Rhondda Cynon Taf (categorised)
 List of electoral wards in Wales

References

Rhondda Cynon Taf